The American Osteopathic Board of Emergency Medicine (AOBEM) is an organization that provides board certification to qualified Doctors of Osteopathic Medicine who specialize in the medical and surgical treatment of acutely ill patients with advanced cardiac life support, trauma, and the management of other life-threatening medical issues (emergency physicians). The AOBEM is one of 18 medical specialty certifying boards of the American Osteopathic Association Bureau of Osteopathic Specialists approved by the American Osteopathic Association (AOA).

As of December 2014, 2,583 osteopathic emergency physicians held active certification with the AOBEM.

Board certification
Board certification is potentially available to osteopathic emergency physicians who have successfully completed an AOA-approved residency in emergency medicine and successfully completed the required clinical, oral, and written examinations. Candidates for certification that applied for entry into the certification pathway after September 1, 2013 must only complete the written (Part I) and oral (Part II) examinations.

Osteopathic emergency medicine physicians may receive Subspecialty Certification (formerly Certification of Added Qualifications) in the following areas:
 Emergency Medical Services
 Medical Toxicology
 Sports Medicine
 Undersea and Hyperbaric Medicine
 Hospice and Palliative Medicine
 Critical Care Medicine
 Surgical Critical Care

See also
 American Board of Emergency Medicine
 American College of Osteopathic Emergency Physicians
 AOA Bureau of Osteopathic Specialists

References

External links
 AOBEM homepage
 American Osteopathic Association

Osteopathic medical associations in the United States
Organizations established in 1980
Medical and health professional associations in Chicago
Emergency medicine organisations